Denis Durnian (born 30 June 1950) is an English professional golfer.

Durnian was born in Wigan, Greater Manchester. He turned professional in 1969 and played on the European Tour from the early 1970s to the early 1990s. He never won a European Tour event, but he finished second four occasions, with one being a defeat in a matchplay final, and twice losing out in a playoff. His best finish on the European Tour Order of Merit was 20th in 1988. In 1985 he won the PLM Open, which became a European Tour event the following season, and he was twice the British Club Professional Champion.

Durnian played in The Open Championship every year from 1982 to 1990, only making the 36-hole cut on one occasion, in 1983 at Royal Birkdale, when he went on to finish tied for 8th place. During the second round he set the record for the lowest nine-hole total in the Open, with 28 on the front nine.

After turning fifty Durnian joined the European Seniors Tour. He has won three tournaments at that level and was second on the end of season Order of Merit in both 2001 and 2002.

Professional wins (7)

Swedish Golf Tour wins (1)

Other wins (3)
1982 PGA Club Professionals' Championship
1984 Wilson Club Professionals' Championship, PGA Fourball Championship (with Derrick Cooper, tied with Philip Posnett & Peter Hanna)

European Senior Tour wins (3)

European Senior Tour playoff record (1–2)

Playoff record
European Tour playoff record (0–2)

Results in major championships

Note: Durnian only played in The Open Championship.

CUT = missed the half-way cut (3rd round cut in 1978 Open Championship)
"T" indicates a tie for a place

Team appearances
Dunhill Cup (representing England): 1989
World Cup (representing England): 1989
PGA Cup (representing Great Britain and Ireland): 1981 (tie), 1982, 1984 (winners), 1986
UBS Warburg Cup (representing the Rest of the World): 2001, 2002

References

External links

English male golfers
European Tour golfers
European Senior Tour golfers
Sportspeople from Wigan
Sportspeople from Chorley
1950 births
Living people